was a football (soccer) club based in Kōchi, the capital city of Kōchi Prefecture of Japan. They played in the Shikoku Adult League. The club was known as Nangoku Kōchi F.C. (南国高知FC). In December 2013 the club name changed to Igosso Kōchi. In January 2016 they came to an agreement with neighbouring club Kōchi U Torastar FC to form a club to represent Kōchi Prefecture in the J.League. In February 2016, the two clubs established Kōchi United SC.

History
The club was founded in the post-war era as Kōchi Agricultural School OB Club (高知農業高校OBクラブ), but in 1966 the name changed to Nangoku Soccer Club (南国サッカークラブ).  Since the inception of the Shikoku Adult League in 1977, this club played as a representative of Kōchi Prefecture and became one of the powerhouse clubs in the league. In 1996 because of sponsorship by Himawari Milk the club changed its name to Himawari Milk Nangoku F.C. (ひまわり牛乳南国FC). The club’s name changed again in 1999 to Nangoku Kōchi F.C. (南国高知FC). The club aimed to become a community-based football club in 2002.

With the introduction of J. League Division 3 in 2014, the club intended to join but decided to postpone it at the deadline submission of J.League Associate Membership in June 2013. In preparation they changed the name of the club to Igosso Kōchi (アイゴッソ高知) for the 2014 season onwards. The name Igosso is a combination of two Japanese words; ai (愛) means love and igossou (いごっそう) from Tosa dialect means "a stubborn man with fortitude".

League record

 Note: The 1994 season saw one game cancelled due to the disqualification of Alex SC who fielded ineligible players.

Honours
Shikoku Adult League
 Winners (6): 1980, 2001, 2002, 2003, 2004, 2005

References

External links
(Japanese) Official Site

Defunct football clubs in Japan
Football clubs in Japan
Sports teams in Kōchi Prefecture